Nora is a 1923 German silent drama film directed by Berthold Viertel and starring Olga Tschechowa, Carl Ebert and Fritz Kortner. It is an adaptation of the 1879 play A Doll's House by Henrik Ibsen. It premiered in Berlin on 2 February 1923. The film's art direction was by Walter Reimann.

Cast
 Olga Tschechowa as Nora 
 Carl Ebert as Torwald Helmer, Nora's husband 
 Fritz Kortner as Krogstadt, lawyer 
 Anton Edthofer as Dr Rank 
 Helga Thomas as Krogstadt's daughter 
 Paul Günther as Krogstadt's son 
 Lucie Höflich as Frau Linden 
 Ilka Grüning as Marianne, Nora's former nanny

References

Bibliography
 Grange, William. Cultural Chronicle of the Weimar Republic. Scarecrow Press, 2008.

External links

1923 films
Films of the Weimar Republic
German silent feature films
German drama films
Films directed by Berthold Viertel
Films based on A Doll's House
1923 drama films
Films with screenplays by Berthold Viertel
German films based on plays
German black-and-white films
Silent drama films
1920s German films
1920s German-language films